Viravul (also, Veravul’) is a village and municipality in the Lankaran Rayon of Azerbaijan.  It has a population of 3,453.

References 

Populated places in Lankaran District